An interdunal wetland, interdunal pond or dune slack is a water-filled depression between coastal sand dunes.  It may be formed either by wind erosion or by dunal encroachment on an existing wetland.  The wind erosion process involves wind scooping out sufficient sand to reach the water table, and typically occurs behind the first line of foredunes.

The Indiana Dunes contain interdunal wetlands.  Many conservation efforts have been made to preserve parts of the Indiana Dunes.

Because they are typically very shallow, interdunal wetlands warm quickly, and provide an abundant source of invertebrates eaten by many species of shorebirds.  Many interdunal wetlands are ephemeral, drying out during periods of low rain or low water.

In the Great Lakes region of North America, interdunal communities are typically mildly calcareous and dominated by rushes, sedges and shrubs.  They are tentatively classified as G2, or globally imperiled, under the NatureServe rankings.

A distinction is sometimes made between interdunal and intradunal wetlands such as pannes, which form within a single dune as part of a blowout.

References

See also 

Dunes
Wetlands